The Islanders Hockey Club are an American junior ice hockey organization from Tyngsborough, Massachusetts. They field teams in the United States Premier Hockey League National Collegiate Development Conference, Premier Division, and Elite Division, as well as in youth and girls leagues.

History

New England Huskies Junior Hockey Club

The New England Huskies Junior Hockey Club is a non-profit 501-3 organization which chartered in 1993 as the Tyngsboro Huskies as a charter member of the Eastern Junior Hockey League (EJHL). The New England Junior Huskies trace their roots to 1981 and Fitchburg's "Wallace Wallopers" of the now-defunct New England Junior Hockey League (NEJHL). The team was renamed the Tyngsboro Huskies in 1993when it joined the EJHL and renamed again in 2000 to the Lowell Junior Lock Monsters, before becoming the New England Junior Huskies in 2004.
 
The stated purpose of the program is to provide a vehicle for athletes to develop as hockey players and to use these gifts to further their educational careers. Players are prepared for the long-term future as productive citizens while being constantly reminded to give the game of hockey its due respect for lessons learned. All Junior Huskies players are required to be in school and/or work, and are required to take the Scholastic Aptitude Test (SAT) tutorial classes that are provided by the organization.

Islanders Hockey Club
In  September 2010, the New England Huskies and the Middlesex Islanders announced that their programs would be merging creating one of the premier developmental and competitive hockey programs in New England. In 2012, the program announced that they were becoming the Islanders Hockey Club.

The next major change for the Islanders was in the fall of 2012 when they announced that they would be one of the founding members of the new United States Premier Hockey League (USPHL).

Junior A team
Before the 2011–12 season USA Hockey had split Tier III junior hockey into Junior A and B divisions. Their former Junior A team now competes in the National Collegiate Development Conference of the USPHL. Prior to the 2013–14 season, the Islanders Junior A team were members of the Northern Division of the Eastern Junior Hockey League (EJHL). The team then joined the Premier Division in the new USPHL until the USPHL started the Tier II NCDC League in 2017.

Team members and regular season
The Islanders typically hold tryouts in late April. The team is usually composed of 12 to 13 forwards, six to seven defensemen, and two goalies on the active roster. All players are between the ages of 16 and 20. The season starts the day after Labor Day and playoffs finish during the third week of March each year and practices 3 to 4 times per week.

The schedule includes regular season games plus three rounds of playoffs.

Season-by-season records

Junior B team
The Islanders also field teams in the USPHL Premier and Elite Divisions (equivalent to the former Tier III Junior B designation). The former Junior B team competed in the Eastern Conference of the Empire Junior Hockey League (EmJHL) prior to its joining the USPHL as the Empire Division (later USP3 Division and then Elite Division).

Notes and references

External links
 United States Premier Hockey League Website
 Islanders webpage

1993 establishments in Massachusetts
Ice hockey teams in Massachusetts
Ice hockey clubs established in 1993
Sports in Middlesex County, Massachusetts